The following is a list of the 365 communes of the Eure-et-Loir department of France.

The communes cooperate in the following intercommunalities (as of 2020):
Communauté d'agglomération Chartres Métropole
Communauté d'agglomération du Pays de Dreux (partly)
Communauté de communes du Bonnevalais
Communauté de communes Cœur de Beauce
Communauté de communes Entre Beauce et Perche
Communauté de communes des Forêts du Perche
Communauté de communes du Grand Châteaudun
Communauté de communes Interco Normandie Sud Eure (partly)
Communauté de communes du Pays Houdanais (partly)
Communauté de communes du Perche
Communauté de communes des Portes Euréliennes d'Île-de-France
Communauté de communes Terres de Perche

References

Eure-et-Loir